A Different Scene is an album by jazz saxophonist Lou Donaldson, his first recorded for the Cotillion label, featuring Donaldson with a big band arranged by Mike Goldberg and Ricky West.

The album was awarded 2 out of 5 stars in an Allmusic review.

Track listing

Recorded at Groove Sound Studios, NYC, April 1976

Personnel
Lou Donaldson – alto saxophone
Mike Goldberg – cornet, trumpet, piano, arranger, conductor
Ricky West – electric piano, clavinet, mellotron, arranger, conductor
Larry Etkin – trumpet
John Kelly – trombone
Robert Corley – tenor saxophone
Joe Ferguson – tenor saxophone, flute
A.C. Drummer Jr. – rhythm guitar
Jacob Hunter – electric bass
Walter "Jojo" Garth – drums
Tony Baxter – lead vocals
Audrinne Ferguson, Cissy Houston, Eddie Jones, Eunice Peterson, Kenny Seymour, Rennelle Stafford – backing vocals
Unidentified string section

References

Lou Donaldson albums
1976 albums
Cotillion Records albums